The rufous-tailed weaver (Histurgops ruficauda) is a species of songbird found in East Africa.

It is included in the weaver family (Ploceidae), but many authors included it in the Old World sparrow family Passeridae when Old World sparrows were separated from the weavers proper. It is placed in the monotypic genus Histurgops.

It is an endemic breeder in  Tanzania, but vagrants occur in Kenya too.

References

rufous-tailed weaver
Endemic birds of Tanzania
rufous-tailed weaver
Taxonomy articles created by Polbot